Doneeka Danyell Lewis, née Hodges (born July 19, 1982), is an American-Bulgarian professional basketball currently playing for Olympiacos in Greece. A 5–9 guard, she was drafted with the 25th overall pick in the 2004 WNBA Draft for the Los Angeles Sparks, out of LSU.

Personal life
She is the twin sister of Roneeka Hodges. She married Gentry Lewis in the fall of 2004.

College career
In her college career, she scored 1,484 points, and collected 418 rebounds. She ranks 11th on the school's all-time scoring list. In 2002 and 2004, she earned second team All SEC honors.

LSU statistics

Source

WNBA career
In four seasons, she has scored 362 points, and has collected 113 rebounds, 165 assists, 43 steals, and 13 blocks. She scored a career high 17 points, during the 2005 season, against the San Antonio Silver Stars.

Overseas career
She is currently playing for Greek champions Olympiacos (2016–17). She played for Galatasaray Medical Park of Turkey in the 2010–11 season.

References

External links
LSU Lady Tigers bio

1982 births
Living people
Bulgarian women's basketball players
American women's basketball players
American emigrants to Bulgaria
Abdullah Gül Üniversitesi basketball players
American expatriate basketball people in Italy
American expatriate basketball people in Turkey
Basketball players from New Orleans
Galatasaray S.K. (women's basketball) players
Indiana Fever players
Los Angeles Sparks draft picks
Los Angeles Sparks players
LSU Lady Tigers basketball players
Olympiacos Women's Basketball players
Seattle Storm players
Shooting guards